Mahmoud Samir Fayed (born December 29, 1986) is a computer programmer, known as the creator of the PWCT programming language. PWCT is a free open source visual programming language for software development. He also created or designed Ring. He is a researcher at King Saud University. Prior to that, he worked at the Riyadh Techno Valley in the Information and Communication Technology Incubator.

Background 

Fayed started to learn computer programming at 10 years old under the supervision of his father who works as a computer programmer. He started using the Clipper programming language under MS-DOS. In 2006 he wrote free Arabic programming books. He studied computer science at the Faculty of Electronic Engineering, Menoufia University, Egypt, graduating in 2008.

Fayed received a Master's degree in 2017, from the College of Computer and Information Sciences, King Saud University, Saudi Arabia.

Career

PWCT language 

In 2005 Fayed began work on a new visual programming language called PWCT and distributed it as a free-open source project in 2008.

Supernova language 

In 2009 Fayed began work on a new programming language called Supernova and distributed it as a free-open source project in 2010. The language support writing the source code in Arabic/English keywords at the same time and it's a Domain-specific language for GUI development using natural code. Supernova is developed using PWCT.

JVLC Journal 

In 2013 Fayed worked with other researchers as a reviewer for the Journal of Visual Languages and Computing. The journal is published by Elsevier.

LASCNN algorithm 

In 2013–2014 Fayed worked with other researchers on designing the LASCNN algorithm. In graph theory, LASCNN is a Localized Algorithm for Segregation of Critical/Non-critical Nodes. The LASCNN algorithm establishes k-hop neighbor list and a duplicate free pair wise connection list based on k-hop information. If the neighbors are stay connected then the node is non critical.

Ring language 

In 2013 Fayed began work on a new programming language called Ring and distributed it as a free-open source project in 2016. Ring aims to offer a language focused on helping the developer with building natural interfaces and declarative DSLs.

Papers 

 Fayed et al., PWCT: a novel general-purpose visual programming language in support of pervasive application development, CCF Transactions on Pervasive Computing and Interaction, 2020
 Imran, MA Alnuem, MS Fayed, A Alamri, Localized algorithm for segregation of critical/non-critical nodes in mobile ad hoc and sensor networks, Procedia Computer Science, 2013

References

Further reading 

 Ayouni (2020) Beginning Ring Programming, Apress (part of Springer Nature)
 Hassouna (2019) Ring Basics (Arabic Book), Hassouna Academy
 Fayed (2016) Ring Programming Language, Code Project
 Fayed (2010) Supernova Programming Language, Code Project

External links 

 PWCT and other stuff 
 Ring programming language 
 Supernova programming language 
 Fayed home page at the King Saud University

1986 births
Living people
Free software programmers
Programming language designers
Open source people
Egyptian computer scientists
King Saud University alumni